So Fresh: The Hits of Autumn 2009 is a compilation album of songs that were popular on the ARIA Charts of Australia in Autumn 2009. It also features a DVD containing the latest music videos. The album was released on 27 March 2009.

Track listing

Disc 1
 Taylor Swift – "Love Story" (3:56)
 Kelly Clarkson – "My Life Would Suck Without You" (3:33)
 The Fray – "You Found Me" (4:03)
 Jessica Mauboy – "Burn" (2:53)
 The All-American Rejects – "Gives You Hell" (3:32)
 Pink – "Please Don't Leave Me" (3:53)
 Cassie Davis – "Like It Loud" (3:06)
 Lady Gaga – "Eh, Eh (Nothing Else I Can Say)" (2:56)
 Wes Carr – "Feels Like Woah" (3:14)
 The Pussycat Dolls featuring Snoop Dogg – "Bottle Pop" (3:31)
 The Ian Carey Project – "Get Shaky" (3:26)
 Britney Spears – "Circus" (3:11)
 Natalie Bassingthwaighte – "Someday Soon" (4:13)
 Global Deejays featuring Rozalla – "Everybody's Free" (Klaas Radio Edit) (3:15)
 Kevin Rudolf featuring Lil Wayne – "Let It Rock" (3:53)
 Akon – "Right Now (Na Na Na)" (4:04)
 Fall Out Boy – "America's Suitehearts" (3:42)
 The Living End – "Raise the Alarm" (3:38)
 Metro Station – "Seventeen Forever" (2:54)
 Secondhand Serenade – "Your Call" (3:55)

Disc 2 (DVD)
 Taylor Swift – "Love Story"
 Kelly Clarkson – "My Life Would Suck Without You"
 The Fray – "You Found Me"
 Jessica Mauboy – "Burn"
 The All-American Rejects – "Gives You Hell"
 Pink – " Please Don't Leave Me"
 Cassie Davis – "Like It Loud"
 The Pussycat Dolls – "Bottle Pop"
 The Ian Carey Project – "Get Shaky"
 Britney Spears – "Circus"
 Kevin Rudolf featuring Lil Wayne – "Let It Rock"
 Akon – " Right Now (Na Na Na)"

Certifications

References

So Fresh albums
2008 compilation albums
2008 video albums
Music video compilation albums
2009 in Australian music